The Heavyweight (+81 kg) competition at the 2014 AIBA Women's World Boxing Championships was held from 19–24 November 2014.

Medalists

Draw

References

Heavyweight